The R713 road is a regional road in County Kilkenny, Ireland. It connects the M9 with the R448, via the villages of Stoneyford and Knocktopher.

References

Regional roads in the Republic of Ireland
Roads in County Kilkenny